Frederick Alvin DuBridge (September 28, 1872 – January 29, 1959) was an American college football coach. He served as the head coach at Indiana State Normal School in 1898 and at Cornell College in Mount Vernon, Iowa from 1904 to 1905.

DuBridge was the father of California Institute of Technology president Lee Alvin DuBridge.

References

1872 births
1959 deaths
Cornell Rams football coaches
Indiana State Sycamores football coaches
People from Cloud County, Kansas
Coaches of American football from Kansas